Lac-Jérôme is an unorganized territory in the Côte-Nord region of Quebec, Canada, part of the Minganie Regional County Municipality. It is named after Lake Jérôme, a small lake on the Mingan River. The Manitou River originates in Lac-Jérôme in Lake Caobus.

As part of the Labrador boundary dispute, the official borders of Lac-Jérôme as claimed by Quebec include part of the territory of Labrador.

Demographics
The area has been completely uninhabited since at least 1991.

Population

See also
 List of unorganized territories in Quebec

References

Unorganized territories in Côte-Nord